Alliance F.C. (Arabic:نادي التحالف لكرة القدم) is an Emirati football club and youth academy based in Dubai. It competes in the Gothia Cup, Mina Cup and other age-group tournaments.

History 
Alliance F.C. was founded by Mehran Rowshan and others in 2015. The club initially started playing at a national and regional level since it's inception. In 2016, Alliance FC participated in the Gothia Cup held in Sweden. They won one match against FK Lillehammer 2 with 0-1 but lost to Gunnilse IS with 3-0. They participated in U-14s 2022 Mina Cup in Dubai where they faced off against Bhayangkara FC. Alliance FC won two matches in DSC Football Academies Championship under U-16 division moving it to the top in group 1. In March 2023, Alliance FC competed against Elite Football Academy and won U-18 Youth Football League.

Alliance Girls Football Club Dubai 
In 2018, Alliance Girls Football Club was established to promote women's football. Currently the club is playing at national level. Salma, who is a Guinness World Record holder for completing 86 “hotstepper” football tricks in one minute is part of the club.

Honours 

 Gothia Cup
 Winner (1): 2016
DSC Champions League
Winner (1): 2020--2022

References 

Football clubs in Dubai
Football clubs in the United Arab Emirates
2015 establishments in the United Arab Emirates